Trump National Doral Miami is a golf resort in Doral in South Florida in the United States. It was founded by real estate pioneer Alfred Kaskel in 1962, with the name "Doral" coming from an amalgamation of the first names of Kaskel and his wife, Doris. It currently has 72 holes of golf and its signature course is the Blue Monster at Doral.

Description

History
The Doral Country Club was built for $10 million by Carol Management, a New York-based real estate firm headed by Alfred Kaskel. The club opened in January 1962.

The resort was the sister hotel to the famous Doral Hotel on the ocean in Miami Beach, Florida.

In 1994, Carol Management sold a majority stake in the resort to KSL Recreation, a Kohlberg Kravis Roberts affiliate focused on premier golf facilities, for approximately $100 million. KSL was then purchased in 2004 by CNL Hospitality (later CNL Hotels & Resorts), a real estate investment trust affiliated with CNL Financial Group. CNL placed the resort under the management of Marriott International later that year. In 2007, CNL Hotels was acquired by the real estate arm of Morgan Stanley.

Around 2010, the Pritikin Longevity Center moved into the spa area of the Doral resort.

In 2011, a group of creditors led by Paulson & Co. took control of the Doral and seven other properties from Morgan Stanley. They quickly placed the Doral and four of the other properties under Chapter 11 bankruptcy protection, and began seeking a buyer for the Doral.

In February 2012, the Trump Organization purchased the Doral Resort & Spa out of bankruptcy for $150 million. The property's name was then changed to Trump National Doral. Trump began a $250-million renovation of the resort in 2013, which was completed in 2016. The purchase and renovation were financed with $125 million in loans from Deutsche Bank.

Trump's purchase included four of the five golf courses. The fifth, the "Great White Course," was excluded from the sale because of its high potential for redevelopment. Instead, it was sold, along with the other bankrupt properties, to GIC, a creditor in the case. GIC sold the course in 2016 for $96 million to two homebuilders: Lennar and CC Homes.

In May 2019 it was reported the resort was in "steep decline" financially, in which its net operating income had fallen by 69 percent – from $13.8 million in 2015 to $4.3 million two years later.

Lawsuits and legal controversies
Trump "has been the target of dozens of liens" from contractors who worked on the renovation project. On May 20, 2016, a Miami-Dade County Circuit Court judge ordered Trump National Doral Miami to be foreclosed and sold on June 28 unless the Trump Organization paid $32,800 to a Miami paint supply company.

Since Trump purchased the resort in 2012, he has challenged the local property tax assessments every year.  In filings with the Federal Election Commission, Trump has consistently claimed high property values for his golf courses; in tax proceedings, however, Trump has generally claimed substantially lower values. In August 2016, Doral Councilwoman Sandra Ruiz challenged the tax assessment for the Doral resort, saying that it was too low and did not account for renovations that increased the value.

In 2017, the resort settled a lawsuit from a guest whose back, face, and arms were bitten by bed bugs.

In October 2019, amidst the impeachment inquiry against Donald Trump, the White House announced that the Doral will host the upcoming 46th G7 summit. Trump suggested that the resort would host the event "at cost" or perhaps at no cost to American taxpayer. The move prompted renewed criticism that Trump was self-dealing in violation of the Foreign Emoluments Clause of the United States Constitution. House Judiciary Committee chairman Jerry Nadler called the selection of Doral "among the most brazen examples yet of the President's corruption." Lack of support from Trump's Republican allies who had grown weary of defending him led Trump to abandon his plans within days of the announcement. This was notable as it was a rare crack in the wall of Trump's Republican support.

Golf courses and tournaments
Trump National Doral Miami features four championship golf courses:
 Blue Monster
 Golden Palm
 Red Tiger
 Silver Fox

The Blue Monster played host to the Doral Open on the PGA Tour from 1962 to 2006, and from 2007 to 2016 the WGC-Cadillac Championship made its home there after having been played at different venues in the United States and Europe since its inception in 1999. In 2016, it was announced that the tournament would be moved to Mexico City.

The resort's other courses have also played host to important events. The Golden Palm hosted the PGA Tour's Qualifying Tournament in 1999 and since 2018 hosts the PGA Tour Latinoamérica Shell Tour Championship, and the Red Tiger hosted The Office Depot on the LPGA Tour in 2000, in addition in 2018 the Shell Tour Championship.

The Latinoamérica Tour Championship was moved in October 2018 after plans to demolish host course Melreese Country Club to build Miami Freedom Park were announced.  Initially, the Shell Tour Championship finished on the 18th hole of Red Tiger, a 526-yard par-5, instead of the Golden Palm 18th, a 469-yard par-4 featuring an island green.

The property was formerly home of The Jim McLean Golf School. The school relocated to the Miami Biltmore Hotel in 2018.

The property is now the home of the Rick Smith Golf Performance Center.

Trump National Doral Miami was featured in Golf magazine's Top 100 resorts in 2019, celebrating the best places in golf to stay and play.

Trump National Doral Miami is scheduled to host the final event in 2022 of the LIV Golf Invitational Series.

Scorecard

See also
 Donald Trump and golf
 List of things named after Donald Trump
 Title of Nobility Clause

References

External links
Trump National Doral Golf Club Official website
Official website

1962 establishments in Florida
Assets owned by the Trump Organization
Destination spas
Doral, Florida
Golf clubs and courses in Florida
Resorts in Florida
Sports venues in Miami